Varney Air Lines was an airline company that started service on April 6, 1926, as an air-mail carrier. Formed by Walter Varney, the airline was based in Boise, Idaho, United States. The airline is one of the predecessors of United Airlines.

Historical background

In 1925, the Congress passed HR 7064 entitled "An Act to encourage commercial aviation and to authorize the Postmaster General to contract for Air Mail Service" (aka "The Kelly Act") which directed the U.S. Post Office Department to contract with private airlines to carry the mail over designated routes many of which connected with the Government operated Transcontinental Air Mail route between New York and San Francisco. Varney won the contract for CAM-5 as the only bidder. Boise Postmaster L.W. Thrailkill had the vision that brought the city into the aerial age. He heard about the proposed northwest route and Varney’s plan and quickly drew up a petition and got signatures from three dozen postmasters from the towns surrounding Boise. Its first flight under contract with the USPOD was from Pasco, Washington to Elko, Nevada with an intermediate stop in Boise. That air freight contract grew into the birth of one of the world’s biggest airlines.

Pasco at the time was a rail center, more or less midway between Portland, Seattle, and Spokane. Mail trains leaving those cities in the evening arrived in Pasco early the next morning. Mail could be transferred to and from the biplanes cutting coast to coast delivery by days. This was the logic for basing the CAM service in Pasco.

First flight
Pilot Leon D. Cuddeback flew the first eastbound CAM-5 flight, leaving in the early dawn hours from Pasco, Washington.

The first westbound flight that afternoon was much less successful, however, as it was forced 75-miles off course by a storm en route from Elko, Nevada, to Boise, Idaho, before making a forced landing near Jordan Valley, Oregon. The westbound flown mail finally arrived at the post office in Pasco late on the morning of April 9, three days after leaving Elko.

Later history
Varney added a Breese-Wilde Model 5 and replaced its original Swallows with C-3 Stearmans and thereafter upgraded as new equipment became available. Subsequent aircraft included the larger M-2 "Bull" Stearman and the Boeing 40 dedicated mail planes, and finally the more modern Boeing 247 twin-engine monoplane. Arriving in 1933, the 247 greatly expanded Varney's ability to carry passengers as well as mail.

Varney soon added Salt Lake City, Portland and Seattle to its route.

In 1930, Varney was acquired by United Aircraft and Transport Corporation, itself formed by a merger of Boeing and Pratt & Whitney Aircraft, and folded into its airlines group along with the other acquired airlines: Pacific Air Transport, Boeing Air Transport, and National Air Transport 

In 1934, the Air Mail scandal resulted in the passage of the Air Mail Act which forbade aircraft manufacturers from operating airlines. As a result United Aircraft and Transport Corporation was broken up. The airlines group became United Airlines. Since Varney was a part of United, the founding year of United is 1926, and making United the oldest commercial airline in the United States.

United Airlines started jet service to Boise on October 16, 1964, and is the only airline to serve Boise continuously since 1933. With the Beeson terminal remodeling at the airport, the last Varney building was torn down in 2002.

Continental Airlines
Following cancellation of all domestic airmail contracts by the Roosevelt administration in 1934, Robert F. Six learned of an opportunity to buy into the Southwest Division of Varney Speed Lines which needed money to handle its newly-acquired Pueblo-El Paso route. Six was introduced to Louis Mueller, who had helped found the Southwest Division of Varney in 1934, and bought into the airline with US$90,000 becoming general manager on July 5, 1936. The carrier was renamed Continental Air Lines (later changed to "Airlines") on July 8, 1937. Six changed the name to "Continental" because he wanted the airline name to reflect his desire to have the airline fly all directions throughout the United States. Decades later, United (the direct successor to Varney) would merge with Continental as well.

See also
 List of companies based in Idaho
 Swan Island Municipal Airport
 List of defunct airlines of the United States

References
Notes

Bibliography

 
 Tillman, Barrett. 'Six Million Miles: The Varney Airlines Story'. Fall, Winter 1971. Journal of the American Aviation Historical Society.

 United Airlines
 Idaho Statesman
 Idaho State Historical Society
 History Link
 Washington State University
 Warhawk Air Museum
 Sue Paul
 Roni Adams

Defunct airlines of the United States
Defunct companies based in Idaho
Airlines established in 1926
Airlines disestablished in 1934
Companies based in Boise, Idaho
Transportation in Ada County, Idaho
Airlines based in Idaho
American companies established in 1926
American companies disestablished in 1934
1926 establishments in Idaho
1934 disestablishments in Idaho